Manoba postpuncta is a moth in the  family Nolidae. It was described by Rothschild in 1913. It is found in New Guinea.

References

Natural History Museum Lepidoptera generic names catalog

Moths described in 1913
Nolinae